Henry Townshend (1736–1762), was an English politician.

He was a Member of Parliament (MP) for Eye 15 April 1758 – January 1760
and 4 December 1761 – 24 June 1762.

References

1736 births
1762 deaths
Members of the Parliament of Great Britain for English constituencies
British MPs 1754–1761
British MPs 1761–1768